John Nicholas Kordic (March 22, 1965 – August 8, 1992) was a Canadian ice hockey player in the National Hockey League.

Hockey career
Kordic played for the Montreal Canadiens, Toronto Maple Leafs, Washington Capitals and Quebec Nordiques, for a total of seven seasons in the NHL. He won the Memorial Cup with the Portland Winter Hawks in 1983, the Calder Cup with the Sherbrooke Canadiens in 1985, and a Stanley Cup with the Montreal Canadiens in 1986. While playing for the Toronto Maple Leafs, he wore No. 27, formerly worn by Leaf players Darryl Sittler and Frank Mahovlich. Kordic was known as an enforcer on the ice.

In 1992, he moved back to Quebec after finishing the season with the Cape Breton Oilers, and had expressed hope that he could turn his life around if he could catch on with the Oilers and play in his hometown.

Death
On August 8, 1992, after overdosing on drugs and being involved in a struggle with police at Motel Maxim in L'Ancienne-Lorette, Quebec, Kordic died of lung failure due to heart malfunction.

Personal life
At the time of Kordic's death he was engaged to marry a former exotic dancer named Nancy Masse, who used to work at a Quebec club called Le Folichon, less than a kilometre from where he died. Kordic's brother, Dan, played for the Philadelphia Flyers organization in the 1990s.

Career statistics

Regular season and playoffs

Awards
 WHL West Second All-Star Team – 1985

See also
List of ice hockey players who died during their playing careers

References

External links
 

1965 births
1992 deaths
Canadian ice hockey defencemen
Canadian people of Croatian descent
Cape Breton Oilers players
Drug-related deaths in Canada
Ice hockey people from Edmonton
Montreal Canadiens draft picks
Montreal Canadiens players
Newmarket Saints players
Portland Winterhawks players
Quebec Nordiques players
Seattle Breakers players
Sherbrooke Canadiens players
Stanley Cup champions
Toronto Maple Leafs players
Washington Capitals players